The Digging Remedy is the eighth studio album by British electronic music duo Plaid. It was announced on 28 April 2016, with the lead single of the album, "CLOCK", being released on the same date, along with an interactive website for the album co-created with digital artist Cabbibo. It was released 10 June 2016 on Warp Records.

Track listing

Personnel
Andy Turner
Ed Handley
Benet Walsh – flute, guitar

Charts

References

External links

2016 albums
Plaid (band) albums
Warp (record label) albums